The 2020 TCU Horned Frogs baseball team represents Texas Christian University during the 2020 NCAA Division I baseball season. The Horned Frogs play their home games at Lupton Stadium as a member of the Big 12 Conference. They are led by head coach Jim Schlossnagle, in his 17th season at TCU.

On March 13, the Big 12 Conference canceled the remainder of the season due to the Coronavirus pandemic.

Previous season
The 2019 TCU Horned Frogs baseball team notched a 29–24 (11–13) regular season record and finished sixth in the Big 12 Conference standings. The Horned Frogs reached the 2019 Big 12 Conference baseball tournament semifinals, where they were defeated by Oklahoma State. TCU received an at-large bid to the 2019 NCAA Division I baseball tournament, where they were defeated in the Fayetteville Regional final by Arkansas.

Personnel

Coaching staff

Roster

Schedule and results

! style=";color:white;" | Regular Season (11–4)
|- valign="top" 

|- bgcolor="#bbffbb"
| February 14 || 6:30 pm ||  || Kentucky* || #20 || Lupton Stadium • Fort Worth, TX || W5–1 || Green(1–0) || Ramsey(0–1) || – || 3,879 || 1–0 || – || StatsStory
|- bgcolor="#bbffbb"
| February 15 || 2:00 pm ||  || Kentucky* || #20 || Lupton Stadium • Fort Worth, TX || W7–1 || Krob(1–0) || Stupp(0–1) || – || 3,986 || 2–0 || – || StatsStory
|- bgcolor="#bbffbb"
| February 16 || 12:30 pm ||  || Kentucky* || #20 || Lupton Stadium • Fort Worth, TX || W10–5 || Hill(1–0) || Marsh(0–1) || – || 4,030 || 3–0 || – || StatsStory
|- bgcolor="#bbffbb"
| February 18 || 6:30 pm ||  || * || #20 || Lupton Stadium • Fort Worth, TX || W14–4 || Cornelio(1–0) || Chirpich(0–1) || – || 3,499 || 4–0 || – || StatsStory
|- bgcolor="#bbffbb"
| February 22 || 6:30 pm || BTN+ || at Minnesota* || #20 || U.S. Bank Stadium • Minneapolis, MN || W12–0 || Ray(1–0) || Meyer(1–1) || – || 1,255 || 5–0 || – || StatsStory
|- bgcolor="#ffbbbb"
| February 23 || 2:00 pm || BTN+ || at Minnesota* || #20 || U.S. Bank Stadium • Minneapolis, MN || L6–7 || Massey(1–0) || King(0–1) || Horton(2) || 938 || 5–1 || – || StatsStory
|- bgcolor="#bbffbb"
| February 24 || 12:15 pm || BTN+ || at Minnesota* || #21 || U.S. Bank Stadium • Minneapolis, MN || W11–2 || Smith(1–0) || Fredrickson(0–2) || – || 242 || 6–1 || – || StatsStory
|- bgcolor="#bbffbb"
| February 26 || 6:30 pm ||  || * || #21 || Lupton Stadium • Fort Worth, TX || W12–3 || Hill(2–0) || Sgambelluri(0–2) || – || 3,712 || 7–1 || – || StatsStory
|- bgcolor="#bbffbb"
| February 28 || 6:30 pm || FSSW+ || * || #21 || Lupton Stadium • Fort Worth, TX || W5–4 || Perez(1–0) || Zobac(1–1) || Beethe(1) || 3,809 || 8–1 || – || StatsStory
|- bgcolor="#bbffbb"
| February 29 || 3:00 pm ||  || California* || #21 || Lupton Stadium • Fort Worth, TX || W3–0 || King(1–1) || Holman(0–3) || Green(1) || 4,507 || 9–1 || – || StatsStory
|-

|- bgcolor="#bbffbb"
| March 1 || 1:00 pm ||  || California* || #21 || Lupton Stadium • Fort Worth, TX || W6–1 || Russell(2–0) || Sullivan(0–1) || – || 3,770 || 10–1 || – || StatsStory
|- bgcolor="#ffbbbb"
| March 3 || 6:30 pm ||  || UT Arlington* || #18 || Lupton Stadium • Fort Worth, TX || L4–612 || Austin(1–0) || Rudis(0–1) || – || 3,304 || 10–2 || – || StatsStory
|- bgcolor="#ffbbbb"
| March 6 || 8:00 pm ||  || at USC* || #18 || Dedeaux Field • Los Angeles, CA || L1–2 || Hurt(2–1) || Ray(1–1) || Wanger(2) || 1,194 || 10–3 || – || StatsStory
|- bgcolor="#bbffbb"
| March 7 || 4:00 pm ||  || at #1 UCLA* || #18 || Jackie Robinson Stadium • Los Angeles, CA || W8–4 || King(2–1) || Nastrini(2–1) || Krob(1) || 952 || 11–3 || – || StatsStory
|- bgcolor="#ffbbbb"
| March 8 || 12:00 pm ||  || #5 Vanderbilt* || #18 || Dedeaux Field • Los Angeles, CA || L3–4 || Brown(1–2) || Hill(2–1) || – || 711 || 11–4 || – || Stats
|- align="center" bgcolor="lightgrey"
| March 10 || 8:00 pm ||  || at * ||  || Tony Gwynn Stadium • San Diego, CA ||  ||  ||  ||  ||  ||  ||  || 
|- align="center" bgcolor="lightgrey"
| March 13 || 6:30 pm || FSSW+ || * ||  || Lupton Stadium • Fort Worth, TX ||  ||  ||  ||  ||  ||  ||  || 
|- align="center" bgcolor="lightgrey"
| March 14 || 2:00 pm ||  || Maryland* ||  || Lupton Stadium • Fort Worth, TX ||  ||  ||  ||  ||  ||  ||  || 
|- align="center" bgcolor="lightgrey"
| March 15 || 1:00 pm ||  || Maryland* ||  || Lupton Stadium • Fort Worth, TX ||  ||  ||  ||  ||  ||  ||  || 
|- align="center" bgcolor="lightgrey"
| March 17 || 6:30 pm ||  || * ||  || Lupton Stadium • Fort Worth, TX ||   ||  ||  ||  ||  ||  ||  || 
|- align="center" bgcolor="lightgrey"
| March 20 || 6:00 pm || ESPN+ || at Oklahoma State ||  || O'Brate Stadium • Stillwater, OK ||  ||  ||  ||  ||  ||  ||  || 
|- align="center" bgcolor="lightgrey"
| March 21 || 3:00 pm || ESPN+ || at Oklahoma State ||  || O'Brate Stadium • Stillwater, OK ||  ||  ||  ||  ||  ||  ||  || 
|- align="center" bgcolor="lightgrey"
| March 22 || 1:00 pm || ESPN+ || at Oklahoma State ||  || O'Brate Stadium • Stillwater, OK ||  ||  ||  ||  ||  ||  ||  || 
|- align="center" bgcolor="lightgrey"
| March 24 || 6:30 pm ||  || at UT Arlington* ||  || Clay Gould Ballpark • Arlington, TX ||  ||  ||  ||  ||  ||  ||  || 
|- align="center" bgcolor="lightgrey"
| March 27 || 6:30 pm ||  || Oklahoma ||  || Lupton Stadium • Fort Worth, TX ||  ||  ||  ||  ||  ||  ||  || 
|- align="center" bgcolor="lightgrey"
| March 28 || 2:00 pm || FSSW+ || Oklahoma ||  || Lupton Stadium • Fort Worth, TX ||  ||  ||  ||  ||  ||  ||  || 
|- align="center" bgcolor="lightgrey"
| March 29 || 12:00 pm || ESPNU || Oklahoma ||  || Lupton Stadium • Fort Worth, TX ||  ||  ||  ||  ||  ||  ||  || 
|- align="center" bgcolor="lightgrey"
| March 31 || 6:30 pm ||  || at Abilene Christian* ||  || Crutcher Scott Field • Abilene, TX ||  ||  ||  ||  ||  ||  ||  || 
|-

|- align="center" bgcolor="lightgrey"
| April 3 || 6:00 pm || ESPN+ || at  ||  || Hoglund Ballpark • Lawrence, KS ||  ||  ||  ||  ||  ||  ||  || 
|- align="center" bgcolor="lightgrey"
| April 4 || 2:00 pm || ESPN+ || at Kansas ||  || Hoglund Ballpark • Lawrence, KS ||  ||  ||  ||  ||  ||  ||  || 
|- align="center" bgcolor="lightgrey"
| April 5 || 1:00 pm || ESPN+ || at Kansas ||  || Hoglund Ballpark • Lawrence, KS ||  ||  ||  ||  ||  ||  ||  || 
|- align="center" bgcolor="lightgrey"
| April 7 || 6:30 pm ||  || UT Arlington* ||  || Lupton Stadium • Fort Worth, TX ||  ||  ||  ||  ||  ||  ||  || 
|- align="center" bgcolor="lightgrey"
| April 9 || 6:30 pm ||  ||  ||  || Lupton Stadium • Fort Worth, TX ||  ||  ||  ||  ||  ||  ||  || 
|- align="center" bgcolor="lightgrey"
| April 10 || 6:30 pm ||  || West Virginia ||  || Lupton Stadium • Fort Worth, TX ||  ||  ||  ||  ||  ||  ||  || 
|- align="center" bgcolor="lightgrey"
| April 11 || 12:00 pm ||  || West Virginia ||  || Lupton Stadium • Fort Worth, TX ||  ||  ||  ||  ||  ||  ||  || 
|- align="center" bgcolor="lightgrey"
| April 14 || 6:30 pm ||  || at Dallas Baptist* ||  || Horner Ballpark • Dallas, TX ||  ||  ||  ||  ||  ||  ||  || 
|- align="center" bgcolor="lightgrey"
| April 17 || 5:30 pm ||  || at * ||  || Melching Field • DeLand, FL ||  ||  ||  ||  ||  ||  ||  || 
|- align="center" bgcolor="lightgrey"
| April 18 || 5:30 pm ||  || at Stetson* ||  || Melching Field • DeLand, FL ||  ||  ||  ||  ||  ||  ||  || 
|- align="center" bgcolor="lightgrey"
| April 19 || 12:00 pm ||  || at Stetson* ||  || Melching Field • DeLand, FL ||  ||  ||  ||  ||  ||  ||  || 
|- align="center" bgcolor="lightgrey"
| April 21 || 6:30 pm ||  || * ||  || Lupton Stadium • Fort Worth, TX ||  ||  ||  ||  ||  ||  ||  || 
|- align="center" bgcolor="lightgrey"
| April 24 || 6:35 pm || ESPN+ || at  ||  || Baylor Ballpark • Waco, TX ||  ||  ||  ||  ||  ||  ||  || 
|- align="center" bgcolor="lightgrey"
| April 25 || 3:05 pm || ESPN+ || at Baylor ||  || Baylor Ballpark • Waco, TX ||  ||  ||  ||  ||  ||  ||  || 
|- align="center" bgcolor="lightgrey"
| April 26 || 1:05 pm || ESPN+ || at Baylor ||  || Baylor Ballpark • Waco, TX ||  ||  ||  ||  ||  ||  ||  || 
|- align="center" bgcolor="lightgrey"
| April 28 || 6:30 pm ||  || Dallas Baptist* ||  || Lupton Stadium • Fort Worth, TX ||  ||  ||  ||  ||  ||  ||  || 
|-

|- align="center" bgcolor="lightgrey"
| May 1 || 6:30 pm || FSSW+ ||  ||  || Lupton Stadium • Fort Worth, TX ||  ||  ||  ||  ||  ||  ||  || 
|- align="center" bgcolor="lightgrey"
| May 2 || 4:00 pm || FSSW || Kansas State ||  || Lupton Stadium • Fort Worth, TX ||  ||  ||  ||  ||  ||  ||  || 
|- align="center" bgcolor="lightgrey"
| May 3 || 1:00 pm || FSSW+ || Kansas State ||  || Lupton Stadium • Fort Worth, TX ||  ||  ||  ||  ||  ||  ||  || 
|- align="center" bgcolor="lightgrey"
| May 8 || 6:30 pm || LHN || at Texas ||  || UFCU Disch–Falk Field • Austin, TX ||  ||  ||  ||  ||  ||  ||  || 
|- align="center" bgcolor="lightgrey"
| May 9 || 2:30 pm || LHN || at Texas ||  || UFCU Disch–Falk Field • Austin, TX ||  ||  ||  ||  ||  ||  ||  || 
|- align="center" bgcolor="lightgrey"
| May 10 || 5:00 pm || FSN || at Texas ||  || UFCU Disch–Falk Field • Austin, TX ||  ||  ||  ||  ||  ||  ||  || 
|- align="center" bgcolor="lightgrey"
| May 12 || 6:30 pm ||  || * ||  || Lupton Stadium • Fort Worth, TX ||  ||  ||  ||  ||  ||  ||  || 
|- align="center" bgcolor="lightgrey"
| May 14 || 6:30 pm || FSSW+ || Texas Tech ||  || Lupton Stadium • Fort Worth, TX ||  ||  ||  ||  ||  ||  ||  || 
|- align="center" bgcolor="lightgrey"
| May 15 || 6:30 pm || FSSW+ || Texas Tech ||  || Lupton Stadium • Fort Worth, TX ||  ||  ||  ||  ||  ||  ||  || 
|- align="center" bgcolor="lightgrey"
| May 16 || 6:30 pm || ESPNU || Texas Tech ||  || Lupton Stadium • Fort Worth, TX ||  ||  ||  ||  ||  ||  ||  || 
|-

| style="font-size:88%" | Legend:       = Win       = Loss       = Canceled      Bold = TCU team member
|-
| style="font-size:88%" | "#" represents ranking. All rankings from Collegiate Baseball on the date of the contest."()" represents postseason seeding in the Big 12 Tournament or NCAA Regional, respectively.

Rankings

References

TCU Horned Frogs
TCU Horned Frogs baseball seasons
TCU Horned Frogs baseball